

244001–244100 

|-bgcolor=#f2f2f2
| colspan=4 align=center | 
|}

244101–244200 

|-bgcolor=#f2f2f2
| colspan=4 align=center | 
|}

244201–244300 

|-bgcolor=#f2f2f2
| colspan=4 align=center | 
|}

244301–244400 

|-bgcolor=#f2f2f2
| colspan=4 align=center | 
|}

244401–244500 

|-bgcolor=#f2f2f2
| colspan=4 align=center | 
|}

244501–244600 

|-bgcolor=#f2f2f2
| colspan=4 align=center | 
|}

244601–244700 

|-bgcolor=#f2f2f2
| colspan=4 align=center | 
|}

244701–244800 

|-bgcolor=#f2f2f2
| colspan=4 align=center | 
|}

244801–244900 

|-bgcolor=#f2f2f2
| colspan=4 align=center | 
|}

244901–245000 

|-id=932
| 244932 Méliés ||  || Georges Méliès (1861–1938), a French film maker and pioneer of science-fiction movies, best known for his 1902 film A Trip to the Moon || 
|}

References 

244001-245000